Aleksandr Borisovich Garmashov (born 8 February 1960) is a Russian professional football coach and a former player.

External links
 

1960 births
Sportspeople from Grozny
Living people
Soviet footballers
FC Kuban Krasnodar players
FC Spartak Vladikavkaz players
PFC Krylia Sovetov Samara players
FK Neftchi Farg'ona players
FC Lokomotiv Nizhny Novgorod players
FC Asmaral Moscow players
Russian footballers
Russian football managers
FC Lada-Tolyatti managers
FC Chernomorets Novorossiysk managers
Russian Premier League managers
Association football defenders
FC Lada-Tolyatti players
FC Mashuk-KMV Pyatigorsk players